Stefanie Rocknak (born March 2, 1966) is a New York-based sculptor and philosopher. She teaches at Hartwick College. Rocknak specializes in David Hume and the philosophy of art. Her writings include "The Mind and the Brain", "Synthese, and Hume Studies", She is the author of book Imagined Causes: Hume's Conception of Objects (The New Synthese Historical Library). As an artist, Rocknak is known for the sculpture, Poe Returning to Boston, a statue of Edgar Allan Poe in Boston, Massachusetts.

Career 
In 2000, Rocknak was a visiting philosophy professor at Connecticut College in London. She is currently in the position of Chair and Professor of Philosophy at Hartwick College. She is also the Coordinator of the Cognitive Science Program, at Hartwick College.

From 2006-2014, she held the position of associate Professor of Philosophy at Hartwick College, Oneonta, NY. She was an instructor at Peters Valley School of Craft (now Haystack Mountain School of Crafts) in 2016, the Appalachian Center for Craft (Tennessee Tech University) in 2014, and Haystack Mountain School of Crafts in 2012.

Rocknak’s sculptures have been nationally and internationally exhibited at venues including the Smithsonian, the Grolier Club in New York, the windows of Saks 5th Ave, NY, the Tampa Museum of Art, and the South Street Seaport Museum, NY. Her work has been featured in multiple publications, including Arts and Antiques and Craft Arts International. Her work Poe Returning to Boston has been covered in The Boston Globe, The New York Times and Boston.com.

Early life and education 
Rocknak received B.A. in American Studies and Art History with a concentration in Painting from Colby College, in May 1988 with distinction in all majors, magna cum laude. She later received her Ph.D. in Philosophy from Boston University in 1998. She specializes in David Hume, the philosophy of art, and the philosophy of mind. She also went to the Rhode Island School of Design summer school in 1986 and the Tyler School of Art in Rome, in 1987.

Books 

 Imagined Causes: Hume's Conception of Objects

References 

Sculptors from New York (state)
Colby College alumni
Boston University alumni
American philosophers
Living people
1966 births